Maurice Griffe (1921–2013) was a French screenwriter. He also worked as an assistant director on two films.

Selected filmography
 Colonel Chabert (1943)
 Paris Frills (1945)
 Father Goriot (1945)
 Women's Games (1946)
 Antoine and Antoinette (1947)
 Last Refuge (1947)
 Cruise for the Unknown One (1948)
 Impeccable Henri (1948)
 Rendezvous in July (1949)
 Mystery in Shanghai (1950)
 Lovers of Toledo (1953)
 Ali Baba and the Forty Thieves (1954)
 Touchez pas au grisbi (1954)
 Mademoiselle from Paris (1955)
 Houla Houla (1959)

References

Bibliography
 Hardy, Phil. The BFI Companion to Crime. A&C Black, 1997.

External links

1921 births
2013 deaths
French screenwriters
People from Creil